Stephen Allen Tolbert (February 16, 1921April 29, 1975) was a Liberian politician and businessman.

Early life
Tolbert was born on February 16, 1921, in Bensonville, the younger brother of William Tolbert. Tolbert received a high school education from Liberia College and in 1941 received a B.A. from the institution. That same year, Tolbert held a chief position at the Division of Passports, and did so until 1943. In 1944, he furthered his education in the United States, first by attending Howard University, then the University of Michigan where he received a B.S. and M.S. in forestry.

Career
Tolbert served as chief of the division of forestry for the Liberian Department of Agriculture from 1948 to 1949. Tolbert then served as assistant secretary of agriculture from 1949 to 1957. He served as director of the school of forestry for the University of Liberia for two years starting in 1959 before serving as the secretary of agriculture and commerce from 1960 to 1965.

Tolbert, with his brother and the vice president of Liberia William, founded the Mesurado Group of Companies, the first Liberian owned multimillion dollar company. It was a fishing enterprise, which expanded its scope as time went on. Tolbert established similar enterprises in Sierra Leone and Nigeria. In 1969, Tolbert got into the shrimping industry. Other business interests of Tolbert's included partial ownership of the Bank of Liberia as well as a diamond exporting firm known as the Liberian American Mining Company.

In 1972, Tolbert was appointed minister of finance. Tolbert resigned from his position at the Mesurado Group of Companies to accept this cabinet appointment. His appointment was controversial, as his brother was now president, and his position was attained in large part due to this relation. Journalist Albert Porte criticized Tolbert for using his public office to advance his business interest in the Mesurado Group of Companies in a 1974 broadside entitled Liberianization or Gobbling Business?. Tolbert sued Porte on the charge of libel for a substantial sum of money, and while Tolbert won the suit, the outcry against the ruling led the founding of the first civil society organization in Liberia.

Death
On April 29, 1975, Tolbert as well as five other associates died in a plane crash after shortly after taking off from Greenville, Liberia to attend a meeting.

References

1921 births
1975 deaths
People from Montserrado County
University of Michigan alumni
University of Liberia alumni
Academic staff of the University of Liberia
Victims of aviation accidents or incidents in Africa
Victims of aviation accidents or incidents in 1975
Finance Ministers of Liberia
Americo-Liberian people
Liberian businesspeople
Commerce and industry ministers
Agriculture ministers
Stephen A.
20th-century Liberian politicians